This is a list of the National Register of Historic Places listings in Victoria County, Texas.

This is intended to be a complete list of properties and districts listed on the National Register of Historic Places in Victoria County, Texas. There are one district and 114 individual properties listed on the National Register in the county. An additional property has since been delisted. Two properties are designated State Antiquities Landmarks while 26 are Recorded Texas Historic Landmarks.

Current listings

The publicly disclosed locations of National Register properties and districts may be seen in a mapping service provided.

|}

Former listing 

|}

See also

National Register of Historic Places listings in Texas
Recorded Texas Historic Landmarks in Victoria County

References

External links

Registered Historic Places
Victoria County